Wolfram Sievers (10 July 1905 – 2 June 1948) was Reichsgeschäftsführer, or managing director, of the Ahnenerbe from 1935 to 1945.

Early life
Sievers was born in 1905 in Hildesheim in the Province of Hanover (now in Lower Saxony), the son of a Protestant church musician. It is reported that he was musically gifted, that he played the harpsichord, organ, and piano, and loved German baroque music. He was expelled from school for being active in the Deutschvölkischer Schutz und Trutzbund and studied history, philosophy, and religious studies at Stuttgart's Technical University while working as a salesman. A member of the Bündische Jugend, he became active in the Artamanen-Gesellschaft ("Artaman League"), a nationalist back-to-the-land movement.

Ahnenerbe
Sievers joined the Nazi Party in 1929. In 1933, he headed the Externsteine-Stiftung ("Externsteine Foundation"), which had been founded by Heinrich Himmler to study the Externsteine in the Teutoburger Wald. In 1935, having joined the SS that year, Sievers was appointed Reichsgeschäftsführer, or General Secretary, of the Ahnenerbe, by Himmler. He was the actual director of Ahnenerbe operations and was to rise to the rank of SS-Standartenführer by the end of the war.

In 1943, Sievers became director of the Institut für Wehrwissenschaftliche Zweckforschung (Institute for Military Scientific Research), which conducted extensive experiments using human subjects. He also assisted in assembling a collection of skulls and skeletons for August Hirt's study at the Reichsuniversität Straßburg as a part of which 112 Jewish prisoners were selected and killed, after being photographed and their anthropological measurements taken.

Trial and execution
Sievers was tried during the Doctors' Trial at Nuremberg after World War II, where he was dubbed "the Nazi Bluebeard" by journalist William L. Shirer because of his "thick, ink-black beard". The Institute for Military Scientific Research had been set up as part of the Ahnenerbe, and the prosecution at Nuremberg laid the responsibility for the experiments on humans which had been conducted under its auspices on the Ahnenerbe. Sievers, as its highest administrative officer, was accused of actively aiding and promoting the criminal experiments.

Sievers was charged with being a member of an organization declared criminal by the International Military Tribunal (the SS), and was implicated in the commission of war crimes and crimes against humanity. In his defense, he alleged that as early as 1933, he had been a member of an anti-Nazi resistance movement which planned to assassinate Hitler and Himmler, and that he had obtained his appointment as Manager of the Ahnenerbe so as to get close to Himmler and observe his movements. He further claimed that he remained in the post on the advice of his resistance leader to gather vital information which would assist in the overthrow of the Nazi regime.

Sievers was sentenced to death on 20 August 1947 in the Doctors' trial, and hanged on 2 June 1948, at Landsberg Prison in Bavaria.

Influence
Russian far-right political philosopher Alexandr Dugin adopted in the 1980s an alter ego with the name of "Hans Sievers", a reference to Wolfram Sievers.

References

External links

 Befragung beim Nürnberger Prozess (Englische Fassung)
 Kriegsverbrechergefängnis (WCP No 1) Landsberg
Michael H. Kater: Das "Ahnenerbe" der SS 1935–1945. Oldenbourg Verlag, 2001, 
Hans-Joachim Lang: Die Namen der Nummern. Hoffmann und Campe, 2004, 
 .

1905 births
1948 deaths
People from Hildesheim
People from the Province of Hanover
SS-Standartenführer
Dachau concentration camp personnel
Nazi human subject research
German people convicted of crimes against humanity
Executions by the United States Nuremberg Military Tribunals
Executed people from Lower Saxony
German people convicted of war crimes
Executed mass murderers